The 2007 Wisconsin–Whitewater Warhawks football team was an American football team that represented the University of Wisconsin–Whitewater as a member of the Wisconsin Intercollegiate Athletic Conference (WIAC) during the 2007 NCAA Division III football season. In their first season under head coach Lance Leipold, the Warhawks compiled a 14–1 record and won the NCAA Division III national championship.  In the Division III playoffs, they defeated Wabash in the quarterfinal, Mary Hardin-Baylor in the semifinal, and Mount Union in the national championship game.

Schedule

References

Wisconsin–Whitewater
Wisconsin–Whitewater Warhawks football seasons
NCAA Division III Football Champions
College football undefeated seasons
Wisconsin–Whitewater Warhawks football